Peas at 5:30, is a 2004 German comedy film directed by Lars Büchel.

Plot
Jakob loses his eyesight in a traffic accident. He became desperate and had no inclination to live anymore When he meets Lilly, a blind teacher, a long journey begins.

Cast 
 Hilmir Snær Guðnason - Jakob
 Fritzi Haberlandt - Lilly
 Harald Schrott - Paul
 Tina Engel - Regine
 Jenny Gröllmann - Franziska
 Alice Dwyer - Alex
 Max Mauff - Ben
 Annett Renneberg - Nina

References

External links
 

2004 comedy films
2004 films
German comedy films
Films about blind people
2000s German films
2000s German-language films